Pyrausta carnifex is a moth in the family Crambidae. It was described by Cajetan von Felder, Rudolf Felder and Alois Friedrich Rogenhofer in 1875. It is found on Hispaniola, Jamaica and the Virgin Islands.

References

Moths described in 1875
carnifex
Moths of the Caribbean